Marcel Granollers and Jack Sock were the defending champions, but chose not to participate together this year. Granollers played alongside Ivan Dodig and successfully defended the title, defeating Fabrice Martin and Édouard Roger-Vasselin in the final, 7–5, 7–6(8–6). Sock teamed up with Nicholas Monroe, but lost to Dodig and Granollers in the semifinals.

Seeds

Draw

Draw

Qualifying

Seeds

Qualifiers
  Marcus Daniell /  Dominic Inglot

Qualifying draw

References
 Main Draw
 Qualifying Draw

Swiss Indoors - Doubles